The Rulers of Nabataea, reigned over the Nabataean Kingdom (also rendered as Nabataea, Nabatea, or Nabathea), inhabited by the Nabateans, located in present-day Jordan, southern Syria, southern Israel and north-western Saudi Arabia.

The queens of the later Nabataean Kingdom figure side by side with their husbands as co-rulers on their coins.

List

See also
Lists of office-holders

References

Sources
Jewish Virtual Library
Martha Ross, Rulers and Governments of the World – Vol1, Earliest Times to 1491. London & New York: Bowker Publishing Company, 1978.

Nabataean monarchs
Nabatea
Nabataeans
Nabatea
Nabatean